The Way I Feel is an album by jazz and R&B guitarist Phil Upchurch recorded in 1969 and released on the Cadet label.

Reception

Allmusic awarded the album 3 stars.

Track listing 
All compositions by Phil Upchurch except as indicated
 "Peter, Peter" (Irwin Rosman) – 3:34  
 "Wild Wood" – 3:02  
 "Time for Love (Is Any Time)" (Quincy Jones, Cynthia Weil) – 3:48  
 "The Way I Feel" (Gordon Lightfoot) – 3:20  
 "Bacn' Chips" – 2:49  
 "You Don't Have to Know" – 4:06  
 "I Don't Know" – 2:48  
 "Softly" (Gordon Lightfoot) – 2:33  
 "Pretty Blue" – 2:41  
 "Electrik Head" – 5:03

Personnel 
Phil Upchurch – guitar
Donny Hathaway – piano
Louis Satterfield – bass 
Morris Jennings – drums
Bobby Christian – percussion
Charles Stepney – arranger and conductor
Elsa Harris, Kitty Heywood, Cash McCall – backing vocals

References 

Phil Upchurch albums
1970 albums
Cadet Records albums
Albums produced by Charles Stepney
Albums arranged by Charles Stepney